Stuart Rawlins may refer to:

Stuart Rawlins (British Army colonel) (1880–1927)
Stuart Blundell Rawlins (1897–1955), British Army major general